Glipa flava is a species of beetle in the genus Glipa. It was described by Fan and Yang in 1993.

References

flava
Beetles described in 1993